The 1966 New Zealand Grand Prix was a race held at the Pukekohe Park Raceway on 8 January 1966.  The race had 19 starters.

It was the 13th New Zealand Grand Prix, and doubled as the opening round of the 1966 Tasman Series.  Graham Hill won his second consecutive NZGP.

Classification 
Results as follows:

References

New Zealand Grand Prix
Grand Prix
Tasman Series
January 1966 sports events in New Zealand